Vémyslice is a market town in Znojmo District in the South Moravian Region of the Czech Republic. It has about 700 inhabitants.

References

Populated places in Znojmo District
Market towns in the Czech Republic